The 1950–51 Connecticut Huskies men's basketball team represented the University of Connecticut in the 1950–51 collegiate men's basketball season. The Huskies completed the season with a 22–4 overall record. The Huskies were members of the Yankee Conference, where they ended the season with a 6–1 record. They were the Yankee Conference regular season champions and made it to the first round of the 1951 NCAA Division I men's basketball tournament. The Huskies played their home games at Hawley Armory in Storrs, Connecticut, and were led by fifth-year head coach Hugh Greer.

Schedule 

|-
!colspan=12 style=""| Regular Season

|-
!colspan=12 style=""| NCAA tournament

Schedule Source:

References 

UConn Huskies men's basketball seasons
Connecticut
Connecticut
1950 in sports in Connecticut
1951 in sports in Connecticut